The renal plexus is a complex network of nerves formed by filaments from the celiac ganglia and plexus, aorticorenal ganglia, lower thoracic splanchnic nerves and first lumbar splanchnic nerve and aortic plexus.

The nerves from these sources, fifteen or twenty in number, have a few ganglia developed upon them.

It enters the kidneys on arterial branches to supply the vessels, Renal glomerulus, and tubules with branches to the ureteric plexus. Some filaments are distributed to the spermatic plexus and, on the right side, to the inferior vena cava.

The ovarian plexus arises from the renal plexus, and is one of two sympathetic supplies distributed to the ovary and fundus of the uterus.

Additional images

References

External links
 

Nerve plexus
Nerves of the torso
Kidney